Pyrgos Kallistis or simply Pyrgos is a village on the Aegean island of Santorini, Greece, in the Cyclades archipelago with a population of 912 according to the 2011 census. Pyrgos is part of the Municipality of Thira and is situated approximately 7 km away from the island's capital Fira. It is built amphitheatrically on a hill that offers magnificent views of Santorini in almost all directions. On top of this hill remain the ruins of a Venetian castle (Kasteli) that was once the island's administrative center. Pyrgos is a typical example of medieval architecture with narrow, labyrinthine streets, fortified walls and hidden passages. Nowadays it is one of the villages of Santorini least spoiled by tourism.

Gallery

References

Santorini
Populated places in Thira (regional unit)